Brad Boyd (born 10 August 1971) is a former Australian rules footballer who played for Fitzroy and the Brisbane Lions in the Australian Football League during the 1990s.

Boyd started his AFL career in 1992 with Fitzroy and played mainly as a ruck-rover, although he was also used as a half back flanker and at centre half-forward. He was a best and fairest winner in 1995, his first season as captain. Also in 1995 he represented Victoria in State of Origin.  He was also captain in 1996 and thus has the distinction of being Fitzroy's last AFL captain. In 1997, he joined the newly formed Brisbane Lions for their inaugural season. He was the club's first signing.

References

1971 births
Living people
Australian rules footballers from Victoria (Australia)
Brisbane Lions players
Fitzroy Football Club players
Mitchell Medal winners
Victorian State of Origin players